Schnusimyia is a genus of picture-winged flies in the family Ulidiidae.

Species
 S. parvula

References

Ulidiidae